Heliconia peteriana is a species of plant in the family Heliconiaceae. It is endemic to Ecuador.  Its natural habitats are the subtropical or tropical moist montane forest.

References

Flora of Ecuador
peteriana
Vulnerable plants
Taxonomy articles created by Polbot